Plinio may refer to:

Pliny, in Italian
 Pliny the Elder (c. 23 – 79)
 Pliny the Younger (61 – c. 113)
Ulmus 'Plinio', an elm cultivar named after Pliny
 Plínio (footballer, born 1946), José Plínio de Godoy, Brazilian football midfielder
 Plínio (footballer, born 1984), Plínio Marcos da Silva, Brazilian football defender